Svetlana Kuznetsova defeated Dinara Safina in the final, 6–4, 6–3 to win the singles tennis title at the 2009 Stuttgart Open. This was the first edition of the tournament played on clay courts, as opposed to hard courts.

Jelena Janković was the defending champion, but lost in the quarterfinals to Flavia Pennetta.

Seeds

Draw

Finals

Top half

Bottom half

External links
Main Draw
Qualifying Draw

Porsche Tennis Grand Prix - Singles
Porsche Tennis Grand Prix